Sneha Shrestha is a Nepali contemporary artist most well known for starting the Children's Art Museum of Nepal and for her graffiti art, using the handle IMAGINE.

Biography 
Shrestha was born in Kathmandu, Nepal. After graduating from Gettysburg College in 2010, Shrestha moved to Boston, Massachusetts. She earned a master's degree from the Harvard Graduate School of Education in 2017. Shrestha works at the Mittal South Asia Institute at Harvard University.

Her signature for her graffiti work is "IMAGINE," which is her mother's name translated into English.

Career

Children's Art Museum of Nepal 
Shrestha founded the Children's Art Museum of Nepal in 2013 with support from World Learning.

Graffiti 
In her graffiti work, Shrestha uses the Nepali alphabet, taking inspiration from Sanskrit scriptures. Shrestha calls these works "calligraffiti," a portmanteau of calligraphy and graffiti.

She has painted numerous murals in Cambridge and Boston, including "For Cambridge With Love From Nepal," "Saya Patri (The One With A Hundred Petals)," "Knowledge is Power" at Northeastern University, and around the world in Kathmandu, Istanbul, and Bali.

She has also collaborated with companies including Reebok, as part of their Artist's Collective collection, as well as TripAdvisor, Red Bull, and Boston craft brewery Aeronaut Brewing Company.

Awards and honors 
In 2018, she was Boston's Artist-in-Residence. In 2019, she was one of the artists selected for the Boston Museum of Fine Art's Community Arts Initiative Artist Project.

Her work is held in the private collections of Capital One, Fidelity Investments, Google, and Facebook.

Exhibitions

Solo exhibitions 

 2019: Golden Equinox, Simmons University Trustman Gallery.
 2019: Mindful Mandalas, Museum of Fine Arts, Boston.
 2018: MANTRA: Sneha Shrestha, Distillery Gallery, Boston.

References

External links 

 IMAGINE website
 Video interview with Beyond Walls

Nepalese women
Harvard University alumni
People from Kathmandu
Graffiti artists
Year of birth missing (living people)
Living people